Leutnant Hermann Habich (1895–?) was one of the original pilots in the Imperial German Air Service, having earned his brevet two months before World War I began. He is noted for having killed French aviation pioneer Roland Garros. Habich scored seven victories in all, becoming a flying ace. He joined the Luftwaffe in the 1930s and served in World War II.

Early life
Habich was born in Plättig, the Grand Duchy of Baden, the German Empire on 15 August 1895. He was a pioneer aviator, having gained his license, number 697, before the start of World War I, on 17 March 1914.

Military career

World War I
Habich was one of the early German military pilots, joining Feldflieger Abteilung 47 performing aerial reconnaissance as an Unteroffizier in late 1914. He then transferred to Flieger-Abteilung (Artillerie) 215 for artillery reconnaissance and ranging duties. He was awarded the Military Karl-Friedrich Merit Order by his native Baden on 5 February 1915, followed by both classes of the Iron Cross; his First Class Iron Cross was awarded 18 March 1916. In August 1916, he was promoted to Offizierstellvertreter and applied for duty in a fighter squadron. On 8 January 1918, he joined Jagdstaffel 49 in France. By this time, as a Leutnant, he was senior enough to sometimes assume command as the deputy commander. He scored his first air-to-air victory on 27 March 1918. By war’s end, he had destroyed five more enemy aircraft and an observation balloon.

Habich is widely credited with being the aviator who shot down and killed French flying ace Roland Garros.

WWI aerial victories
See also Aerial victory standards of World War I

World War II
By the 1930s, Habich worked as a military pilot and flight instructor in the Luftwaffe. He served on the Eastern Front commanding a Nachtschlachtgruppe in 1944.

Honors and awards
 :
 Iron Cross, 1st and 2nd Classes
 :
 Knight of the Military Karl-Friedrich Merit Order

References
 Franks, Norman; Frank Bailey;Russell Guest (1993) Above the Lines: The Aces and Fighter Units of the German Air Service, Naval Air Service and Flanders Marine Corps, 1914-1918. Grub Street Publishing. , .
  Guttman, Jon (2002). SPAD XII/XIII aces of World War I. Osprey Publishing.

Endnotes

External links
 Rise of Flight website() has a photograph of Habich posed in front of his airplane.
 Rise of Flight website() also has a modeler's color recreation of Habich's Albatros

1895 births
Year of death missing
People from the Grand Duchy of Baden
German World War I flying aces
People from Rastatt (district)
Military personnel from Baden-Württemberg
Luftwaffe personnel of World War II
Recipients of the Iron Cross (1914), 1st class